André Sollie (born 7 July 1947) is a Belgian author and illustrator of children's literature.

Career 

Sollie made his debut in children's poetry with Soms, dan heb ik flink de pest in in 1986.

In 2000, Sollie and Ingrid Godon published the children's book Wachten op Matroos. They both won the Gouden Griffel award a year later for this book. The English translation of the book Hello, Sailor  was published in 2003. The book is about a lighthouse keeper called Matt and his friend, Sailor, whom he deeply misses. The book caused controversy in England as it was argued that its inclusion in school curricula effectively forced schools to include books with homosexual characters.

In 2004, he published Dubbel Doortje which was the first book that he both wrote and illustrated himself. He won the Boekenpluim award for his illustrations in this book.

His 2005 novel for adolescents Nooit gaat dit over was turned into the 2011 feature film North Sea Texas (Noordzee, Texas) by Bavo Defurne.

Sollie won the Boekenpauw award twice for his illustrations: in 1998 for the book De brief die Rosie vond written by Bart Moeyaert and in 2010 for the book De Zomerzot which he wrote himself.

Awards 
 1982: Prijs van de Kinder- en Jeugdjury voor het boek in Vlaanderen, De bloeiende mimosaboom
 1986: Prijs van de Kinder- en Jeugdjury voor het boek in Vlaanderen, De witte vogel
 1991: Prijs van de Kinder- en Jeugdjury voor het boek in Vlaanderen, 35 boeven in Moo
 1993: Prijs van de Kinder- en Jeugdjury voor het boek in Vlaanderen, Hotel Hoteldebotel
 1998: Boekenpauw, De brief die Rosie vond (written by Bart Moeyaert)
 1998: Boekenwelp, Het ijzelt in juni
 2001: Gouden Griffel, Wachten op Matroos (with Ingrid Godon)
 2005: Boekenpluim, Dubbel Doortje
 2007: Prijs van de Vlaamse Gemeenschap voor Jeugdliteratuur, Een raadsel voor Roosje
 2010: Boekenpauw, De Zomerzot

References

External links 
 André Sollie (in Dutch), Digital Library for Dutch Literature
 André Sollie (in Dutch), jeugdliteratuur.org

1947 births
Living people
Belgian children's book illustrators
Flemish writers
20th-century Belgian writers
21st-century Belgian writers
Boekenpauw winners
Gouden Griffel winners